An unauthorised arrival is a person who has arrived in a country of which they are not a citizen and does not have a valid visa or does not satisfy other required conditions for entry to that country.

A person may be described as an unauthorised arrival when they have crossed a national border with the intention of applying for refugee status, in which case they may be described as an asylum seeker. If a person enters a country without authorisation intending to live and work in that country, they may be described as an illegal immigrant.

Under the United Nations Convention Relating to the Status of Refugees, a person has the right to cross national borders if they are seeking asylum from political repression or various other forms of persecution.

The Universal Declaration of Human Rights declares:
"Everyone has the right to leave any country, including his own, and to return to his country."

See also
Illegal entry
Asylum shopping
Mandatory detention
Refugee law
Right of asylum

References 

Human migration